Glasier is a surname. Notable people with this surname include:

Hugh Glasier, English politician
John Glasier, Canadian politician
John Bruce Glasier, Scottish politician
Katharine Glasier, British journalist
William Glasier, English politician

See also
Glazier (surname)